The following is a list of the television and radio networks and announcers who have broadcast the National Football Conference Championship Game throughout the years. The years listed concentrate on the season instead of the calendar year that the game took place. The forerunner to the NFC Championship Game (prior to the 1970 AFL–NFL merger) was the NFL Championship Game.

Television

2020s

2010s

2000s

Notes
In 2008, Fox's studio show did not go on-site for the first time since 2001. However, Terry Bradshaw left the studios in Los Angeles after the pregame show so he could emcee the trophy presentation.

1990s

1980s

Notes
It is often mistakenly assumed that Pat Summerall and John Madden handled the call on CBS-TV for the 1981 NFC Championship Game, when San Francisco 49ers wide receiver Dwight Clark made "The Catch" to lift the 49ers to a 28–27 victory over the Dallas Cowboys and a berth in Super Bowl XVI. Summerall instead handled the call of the game on CBS Radio with Jack Buck, while Vin Scully and Hank Stram (CBS' "B team" for NFL broadcasts in 1981) called the game on television. Meanwhile, John Madden was off to Detroit to prepare for his Super Bowl telecast with Summerall. Hank Stram returned to his normal position as the color analyst on CBS Radio alongside Buck for the Super Bowl, while Summerall and Madden teamed for the first of eight Super Bowls together.

1970s

Radio

2020s

2010s

2000s

1990s

1980s

1970s

See also
List of Super Bowl broadcasters
List of AFC Championship Game broadcasters
List of NFL Championship Game broadcasters
List of AFL Championship Game broadcasters

References

NFC Championship Game broadcasters
Broadcasters
NFC Championship Game broadcasters
NFC Championship Game broadcasters
CBS Radio Sports
NBC Radio Sports
Westwood One